Decatur is the county seat of Wise County, Texas, United States. Its population was 6,538 in 2020.

History
Wise County was established in 1856, and Taylorsville (in honor of Zachary Taylor) was made the county seat.

Absalom Bishop, an early settler and member of the Texas Legislature, opposed naming the town after a Whig Party member, and in 1858, arranged to have the name changed to Decatur, in honor of naval hero Stephen Decatur.

In 1857, a post office was opened, and the first school was established in 1857. In the early 1860s, a courthouse was erected.

Civil War

Early settlers to northern Texas came from a variety of eastern states, with about half coming from the "Deep South". Most of the rest came from the Upper South, and a number sympathized with the Unionist side at the outset of the Civil War. Cooke County and others voted against secession in this part of the state. Violence against Unionists by Confederate troops and militia was common, especially after the Confederate legislature passed an unpopular conscription law.

In October 1862, several Unionist sympathizers from Decatur were arrested by Confederate troops and taken to nearby Gainesville, the Cooke County seat, for trial on charges of treason and insurrection. About 150–200 suspects were arrested by Confederate troops. A "Citizens Court" was pulled together by local colonels, although it had no standing in state law. It quickly convicted seven men, who were executed by hanging. Mob pressure against the court arose, and it turned over 14 suspects, who were lynched - executed by hanging without any judicial process. Nineteen men who had been acquitted were returned to the court, and a new jury convicted them without any new evidence, sentencing them to death. They were also hanged. Another two men were shot trying to escape. In all,  42 men were killed in Gainesville in these actions.

North Texas was in chaos, with dissenting citizens at risk from military forces. A few weeks later, more suspected Unionist supporters were hanged without trial in several North Texas communities. Five were lynched in Decatur, under the supervision of Confederate Capt. John Hale. The Great Hanging at Gainesville is believed to have been the largest single incident of vigilante violence in U.S. history.

After the Civil War
By the late 1860s, several stores and a hotel had been established. In 1882, the Fort Worth and Denver Railway reached the town, and Decatur was added to the Butterfield Overland mail route.

In 1881, the Wise County Old Settlers Reunion held their first meeting. This has become an annual tradition in Decatur, and the reunion continues to take place during the last full week of July.

Decatur Baptist College (now Dallas Baptist University) was established in Decatur in 1898. It was the first two-year institution of higher education in Texas. In 1965, the college moved to Dallas to be in a larger population center. The former Administration Building then housed the Wise County Heritage Museum. The building was destroyed in a fire in 2023. It is one of five sites in Decatur listed on the National Register of Historic Places. 

The Wise County Courthouse was designed by James Riely Gordon, the master architect of Texas courthouses. Completed in 1896, the building is an example of Gordon's Signature Plan. He used corner entrances (making for short halls) to draw in the breeze, which was pulled up through a central atrium like a chimney, providing excellent air circulation. The exterior is Texas red granite (like the Capitol) with terra cotta ornamentation. The almost pyramidal mass refers to 1,000-year-old churches in the south of France. The building has been praised, with its "sister" courthouse in Waxahachie, as "the zenith of Gordon's Richardsonian Romanesque work". It is listed on the National Register of Historic Places.

In 1962, Eddie Wayne Hill, lead guitarist for Tommy & the Tom Toms, and drummer Joel Colbert, were killed when their convertible collided head-on with a gravel truck on State Highway 114 south of Decatur. Country singer Charley Pride was more fortunate, surviving a mid-air crash with another plane over Decatur in 1980, though two people died in the crash.

Geography
The highest point of elevation in the county is the courthouse site. As with ancient hill towns in Europe, the frontier settlement was developed on high ground for defensive purposes, so European settlers could see and ward off attacks or raids, in this case by Native Americans.

Climate
The climate in this area is characterized by hot, humid summers and generally mild to cool winters. According to the Köppen climate classification, Decatur has a humid subtropical climate, Cfa on climate maps.

Demographics

As of the 2020 United States census, there were 6,538 people, 2,507 households, and 1,753 families residing in the city.

Economy
In August 2008, Entegris acquired Poco Graphite, Inc. of Decatur, a supplier of specialized graphite and silicon carbide products for use in semiconductor, EDM, glass-bottling, biomedical, aerospace, and alternative-energy applications.

Arts and culture
Decatur has a full-service library.

The Service Broadcasting Tower Decatur, a guyed TV-mast, belongs to world's tallest constructions.

Parks and recreation
Kenny Renshaw Park, located off FM 51 in south Decatur, features soccer fields, softball fields, a playground, and a walking trail.
The Lyndon B. Johnson National Grassland, home to several lakes and many miles of hiking and equine trails, is located just north of Decatur.
The Sid Richardson Scout Ranch is a Boy Scout camp on Lake Bridgeport, near Decatur.
Wildwood Naturist's Resort is a family-oriented nudist club in Decatur.
Eagle's Canyon Raceway, an auto racing park in Decatur, was included on the 2011 LATAM Challenge Series.

Education
The City of Decatur is served by the Decatur Independent School District (DISD), the largest district in Wise County. Decatur ISD is centered in Decatur and has six campuses: Decatur High School, McCarroll Middle School, Carson Elementary School, Rann Elementary School, and Young Elementary. During the 2010–2011 school year, Decatur ISD had 3,011 students enrolled.

Weatherford College has a branch campus in Decatur.

Infrastructure

Highways

Airport
Decatur Municipal Airport is a city-owned public-use airport located 2 miles north of the central business district.
Bishop Airport is a privately owned public-use airport located 6 miles east of the central business district of Decatur.

Emergency services
Lifeteam 68, of the Air Evac Lifeteam air ambulance company, is based at Wise Regional Hospital in Decatur.

Notable people 
 Trevor Brazile, world-champion rodeo cowboy
 Roy Cooper, and Tuf Cooper: father/son world-champion rodeo cowboys
 Bryce Elder, starting pitcher for the Atlanta Braves
 John E. Hatley, former Master Sergeant in the U.S. Army; convicted of murdering 4 Iraqi detainees, he is serving a 40-year sentence in Fort Leavenworth
 Mike Lee, professional bull rider
 James Maness, professional football player
 Joseph Fort Newton, minister, author
 Tom Pickett, 19th-century cowboy, professional gambler, lawman, outlaw
 William Raborn, Director of the Central Intelligence Agency
 Texas Ruby, country music singer
 Phil Ryan, Texas Ranger, 3-term Wise County sheriff
 Samuel M. Sampler, recipient of America's highest military award—the Medal of Honor—for his actions during World War I
 Belle Hunt Shortridge (1858–1893), author
 Tommy Tatum, professional baseball player
 Guinn Williams, U.S. Representative from Texas
 Guinn "Big Boy" Williams, Western movie star

In popular culture
"Eighter from Decatur" is a slang phrase used by craps shooters who want to roll an eight, as well as the title of a song (minus the "e" in eighter) by Western Swing legend Bob Wills. In 1949, Decatur mayor Sly Hardwick added the phrase to two signs welcoming tourists to the town.

References

External links

City of Decatur – Official Website
Decatur Chamber of Commerce

Cities in Texas
County seats in Texas
Dallas–Fort Worth metroplex
Cities in Wise County, Texas
Butterfield Overland Mail in Texas
Stagecoach stops in the United States